Mocis undifera  is a species of moth of the family Erebidae. It is found in South America, including Ecuador.

References

Moths described in 1913
Mocis